James Fisher (b. 20 April 1972 Walthamstow, London) is an actor and producer. He is the youngest of three brothers. He studied acting at the London Drama School (Trinity Licentiate Diploma in Performance Arts) and was also educated in screen acting at the Drill Hall.

Known for his roles in BBC's EastEnders, ITV's Tina & Bobby, and BBC2 Comedy White Gold, James also produced feature documentary Royd Tolkien's There's a Hole In My Bucket, featuring Peter Jackson, John Rhys Davies and Billy Boyd. James also starred in, and produced, Raindance Festival selection Black Smoke Rising and the 'best film' award winning Monk3ys. Both films marked his first steps into film producing.

Previous acting roles include Green Street, Oscar winning The Constant Gardener, Irwin Winkler's De-Lovely and a large selection of independent films including Vengeance, Aux, Invasion of the Not Quite Dead, and award winning UK horror film The Zombie Diaries playing the character Geoff.

References

External links 
 
 Official James FIsher Website

English male film actors
English male television actors
Living people
1972 births
Male actors from London